Bryce Haugeberg (born August 5, 2003) is an American professional stock car racing driver. He currently competes part-time in the ARCA Menards Series, driving the No. 11 for Fast Track Racing.

Racing career

ARCA Menards Series 
Haugeberg would first make his debut in the ARCA Menards Series, driving the No. 01 for Fast Track Racing. He would retire after being spun by Drew Dollar, retiring in 25th. He would make two more starts, finishing with a best of 13th at the 2021 Zinsser SmartCoat 200.

In 2022, he would drive for the No. 94 for his own team Haugeberg Racing in the superspeedway events. Haugeberg's No. 94 would also have a technical partnership with Cram Racing Enterprises. Haugeberg would also drive for Fast Track Racing in numerous races in a partnership with his own team. In the Atlas 100, Haugeberg was involved in a violent crash with dirt track star Buddy Kofoid, where Kofoid ran into a slowing Haugeberg, causing the latter's car to roll over several times before coming to rest on its side. Both drivers were able to walk away from the crash without serious injury.

Dirt track racing 
Haugeberg races in the POWRi Minn-Kota Lightning Sprints series, driving the No. 22.

Personal life 
Bryce has a brother, Jake, who also is a racing driver.

Motorsports career results

ARCA Menards Series 
(key) (Bold – Pole position awarded by qualifying time. Italics – Pole position earned by points standings or practice time. * – Most laps led.)

ARCA Menards Series East

ARCA Menards Series West

References

External links 
 

2003 births
Living people
ARCA Menards Series drivers
NASCAR drivers
Racing drivers from North Dakota
People from West Fargo, North Dakota